Debenham Glacier is a glacier flowing into the northern part of Wilson Piedmont Glacier on the coast of Victoria Land. It was first mapped by the British National Antarctic Expedition, 1901–04, and was named by the British Antarctic Expedition, 1910–13, for Frank Debenham, a geologist with the expedition and Director of the Scott Polar Research Institute, 1925–48.

See also 
 List of glaciers in the Antarctic
 Glaciology

Further reading 
 United States. Defense Mapping Agency. Hydrographic Center (1943), Sailing Directions for Antarctica: Including the Off-lying Islands South of Latitude 60°, PP 200 - 201
 Jane G. Ferrigno, Kevin M. Foley, Charles Swithinbank, and Richard S. Williams, Jr., Coastal-Change and Glaciological Map of the Ross Island Area, Antarctica: 1962–2005, USGS

External links 

 Debenham Glacier on USGS website 
  Debenham Glacier on SCAR website
 Debenham Glacier area map

References 
 

Glaciers of Scott Coast